Agustín Rodrigo Briones (born October 4, 1988) is an Argentine footballer currently playing for Deportes Concepción of the Primera División B in Chile.

Teams
  Aldosivi de Mar del Plata 2008-2014
  Deportes Concepción 2014–2015
  Mushuc Runa 2015
  San Martín 2016-2017
  Gimnasia y Esgrima 2017-2018
  Chaco For Ever 2018
  Almirante Brown 2019
  Deportivo Riestra 2020
  Talleres 2020-2021
  Deprotivo Camioneros 2021-Present

References
 
 

1988 births
Living people
Argentine footballers
Argentine expatriate footballers
Aldosivi footballers
Deportes Concepción (Chile) footballers
Primera B de Chile players
Expatriate footballers in Chile
Association football midfielders